Pedro Henrique Silva Spajari (born February 18, 1997 in Amparo) is a Brazilian swimmer.

International career

2015-2019
At the 2015 FINA World Junior Swimming Championships held in Singapore, he finished 5th in the 100 metre freestyle., and 4th in the 4 × 100 m freestyle relay.

In 2016, Spajari discovered he has Klinefelter syndrome. The problem reduces the body's testosterone level, affects attention, and impairs immunity. The syndrome reduced his performance and ended his dream of defending the Brazilian team at the 2016 Summer Olympics in Rio de Janeiro. Upon discovering the problem, he began the medical treatment with hormone replacement duly authorized by the sports authorities.

He was at the 2017 Summer Universiade, finishing 6th in the 100 metre freestyle, 5th in the 4 × 100 m medley relay, and 6th in the 4 × 100 m freestyle relay.

At the 2018 Pan Pacific Swimming Championships in Tokyo, Japan, Spajari won the gold medal in the Men's 4 × 100 metre freestyle relay, along with Gabriel Santos, Marco Ferreira Júnior and Marcelo Chierighini. He also finished 4th in the Men's 4 × 100 metre medley relay, 6th in the Men's 50 metre freestyle., and 7th in the Men's 100 metre freestyle.

At the 2019 World Aquatics Championships in Gwangju, South Korea, in the Men's 4 × 100 metre freestyle relay, he finished 6th, helping Brazil qualify for the Tokyo 2020 Olympics.

At the 2019 Pan American Games held in Lima, Peru, he won a gold medal in the Men's 4 × 100 metre freestyle relay, along with Breno Correia, Marcelo Chierighini and Bruno Fratus, with a time of 3:12.61, a new Pan American Games record. In the Mixed 4 × 100 metre freestyle relay, he won a silver medal, by participating at heats. He also finished 5th in the Men's 50 metre freestyle.

2020 Summer Olympics
At the 2020 Summer Olympics in Tokyo, Spajari finished 8th in the Men's 4 × 100 metre freestyle relay and 25th in the Men's 100 metre freestyle.

2021-2024
At the 2022 FINA World Swimming Championships (25 m), in Melbourne, Australia, he finished 4th in the Men's 4 × 100 metre freestyle relay, 8th in the Men's 4 × 50 metre freestyle relay and in the Mixed 4 × 50 metre freestyle relay, 9th in the Men's 4 × 200 metre freestyle relay, 16th in the Men's 100 metre freestyle, and 42nd in the Men's 50 metre freestyle.

References

1997 births
Living people
Brazilian male freestyle swimmers
Intersex men
Intersex sportspeople
Swimmers from São Paulo
Swimmers at the 2019 Pan American Games
Pan American Games gold medalists for Brazil
Pan American Games silver medalists for Brazil
Pan American Games medalists in swimming
Medalists at the 2019 Pan American Games
Swimmers at the 2020 Summer Olympics
Olympic swimmers of Brazil
Competitors at the 2017 Summer Universiade
21st-century Brazilian people
People from Amparo, São Paulo